Charles Horace Holmes (October 24, 1827 – October 2, 1874) was a member of the United States House of Representatives from New York.

Life and career
Holmes was born in Albion, Orleans County, New York on October 24, 1827. He attended the public schools and Albion Academy, and graduated from Albany Law School in 1854.  He was admitted to the bar in 1855 and commenced practice in Albion.

He was elected as a Republican to the Forty-first Congress to fill the vacancy caused by the resignation of Noah Davis and served from December 6, 1870, to March 3, 1871; he was not a candidate for renomination. He resumed the practice of law in Albion.  He died on October 2, 1874 and was interred in Mount Albion Cemetery.

References

Albany Law School alumni
New York (state) lawyers
People from Albion, Orleans County, New York
1827 births
1874 deaths
Republican Party members of the United States House of Representatives from New York (state)
19th-century American politicians
19th-century American lawyers